{{Infobox government cabinet|cabinet_type=Ministry|cabinet_number=23rd|jurisdiction=the State of Karnataka|flag=|flag_border=true|incumbent=|image=The Union Minister for External Affairs, Shri S.M. Krishna addressing the Press, in New Delhi on January 07, 2011.jpg|image_size=250px|caption=S. M. KrishnaHon'ble Chief Minister of Karnataka|date_formed=11 October 1999|date_dissolved=28 May 2004|government_head=S. M. Krishna|deputy_government_head=|government_head_history=|state_head=Khurshed Alam Khan(6 January 1992 – 2 December 1999)V. S. Ramadevi(2 December 1999 – 20 August 2002)T. N. Chaturvedi(21 August 2002 – 20 August 2007)|members_number=|former_members_number=|total_number=|political_parties=INC|legislature_status=Majority|opposition_cabinet=|opposition_party=BJP|opposition_leader=Jagadish Shettar|election=1999|last_election=2004|legislature_term=4 years 8 months|budget=|advice_and_consent1=|advice_and_consent2=|incoming_formation=|outgoing_formation=|previous=J. H. Patel ministry|successor=Dharam Singh ministry}}S. M. Krishna ministry was the Council of Ministers in Karnataka, a state in South India headed by S. M. Krishna that was formed after the 1999 Karnataka elections.

In the government headed by S. M. Krishna, the Chief Minister''' was from INC. Apart from the CM, there were other ministers in the government.

Tenure of the Government 
In 1999, as Karnataka Pradesh Congress Committee president, S. M. Krishna led his Indian National Congress party to victory in the assembly polls and took over as Chief Minister of Karnataka, a post he held until 2004. He was also instrumental in creating power reforms with ESCOMS and digitization of land records (BHOOMI) and many other citizen friendly initiatives. He encouraged private public participation and was a fore bearer of the Bangalore Advance Task Force.

Council of Ministers

Chief Minister

Cabinet Ministers

Minister of State 

If the office of a Minister is vacant for any length of time, it automatically comes under the charge of the Chief Minister.

See also 

 Karnataka Legislative Assembly

References

External links 

 Council of Ministers

Cabinets established in 1999
1999 establishments in Karnataka
Krishna
2004 disestablishments in India
Cabinets disestablished in 2004
1999 in Indian politics
Indian National Congress state ministries